The  governed Japan under the leadership of Prime Minister Tetsu Katayama from May 1947 to March 1948. It was the first cabinet under the postwar constitution.

Cabinet 
The Japan Socialist Party (Nihon Shakaitō, JSP) had emerged as strongest party from both the 23rd lower house election and the 1st upper house election. However, the formation of a coalition proved difficult as any majority coalition would involve at least two of the three largest parties. While the Socialists offered the conservative Japan Liberal Party (Nihon Jiyūtō, JLP) of incumbent prime minister Shigeru Yoshida a grand coalition, Yoshida refused active participation in the government. Under the new constitution, the prime minister was no longer selected by the Emperor, but elected by the Diet, "before the conduct of any other business" – and the Socialists pushed for an early vote to prevent the other two major parties from excluding them from a ruling coalition: on May 23, Socialist Tetsu Katayama was elected almost unopposed (420 votes of 426 present in the House of Representatives, 205 of 207 in the House of Councillors) while the coalition negotiations were still in progress. When Katayama formally became prime minister on May 24 after his ceremonial investiture by the Emperor, he technically held all ministerial posts – a so-called "one-man cabinet" (hitori naikaku, 一人内閣). The JLP still refused cooperation, and the JSP eventually agreed on a coalition with the Democratic Party (Minshutō) and the National Cooperative Party (Kokumin Kyōdōtō). Together, the three parties held a solid majority in the HR, and were able to control the HC given the fact that the largest group there, the Ryokufūkai formed by independents, was willing to support the government. The other cabinet members were eventually appointed on June 1. The cabinet initially consisted of seven Socialists (including the prime minister), eight Democrats, two Cooperativists and one Ryokufūkai member.

After conflicts over price controls and taxes, the left wing of the Socialist Party threatened to block the budget for fiscal 1948 (begins in April), and in February 1948, Katayama resigned. Deputy prime minister Hitoshi Ashida was elected on February 21 to succeed him, the Katayama Cabinet remained in office until his investiture on March 10. The three-party coalition of Socialists, Democrats and Cooperativists continued under Democrat Ashida, however the Ashida Cabinet would be engulfed by the largest corruption scandal of the occupation period and last even shorter.

References 

 Kantei, Japanese Cabinet: Katayama Cabinet 
 Kohno, Masaru (1997): Japan's Postwar Party Politics. Princeton, pp. 49–67, "Chapter 4: Coalition building under the pre-1955 multiparty system".

Cabinet of Japan
Cabinets established in 1947
Cabinets disestablished in 1948
1947 establishments in Japan
1948 disestablishments in Japan